Thomas Buckner (born 1941) is an American baritone vocalist specializing in the performance of contemporary classical music and improvised music.  In his work, he utilizes a wide range of extended (non-traditional) vocal techniques.

Buckner also works as a concert promoter; in Berkeley, California, he founded the 1750 Arch Concerts, which presented over 100 musical events per year for eight years.  He also founded the record label 1750 Arch Records, which released more than 50 LPs.  Also in Berkeley, he co-led the 23-member Arch Ensemble. He operates the record label Mutable Music.

Buckner has performed with Roscoe Mitchell, Gerald Oshita, Phill Niblock, Borah Bergman, David Darling, Gustavo Aguilar, Wu Man, and Earl Howard.  More than 70 composers have created works for him; these include Robert Ashley, Noah Creshevsky, Alvin Lucier, Annea Lockwood, Bun-Ching Lam, Morton Subotnick, Jerome Cooper, David Wessel, Tom Hamilton, Leroy Jenkins, Wadada Leo Smith.

Biography

Buckner is a grandson of International Business Machines founder Thomas J. Watson, Sr.  In the early 1970s, while his uncle John N. Irwin, II served as the U.S. Ambassador to France, Buckner was one of approximately 500 left-leaning Americans on Richard Nixon's so-called "enemies list."

He grew up in Westchester County, New York, and has lived in New York City since 1983.  His wife is the bharatanatyam dancer Kamala Cesar, whom he married in 1992.  He is the brother of painter Walker Buckner and children's advocate Elizabeth Buckner.

Buckner is an alumnus of the Music Academy of the West, where he attended in 1970.

Discography

With Muhal Richard Abrams
The Visibility of Thought (Mutable, 2001)

With Jerome Cooper
Alone, Together, Apart (Mutable, 2003)

With Roscoe Mitchell
8 O'Clock: Two Improvisations (Mutable, 2001)
Numbers (RogueArt, 2011)

References

External links
Thomas Buckner official site
"Baritone Buckner Follows a Different Drummer", by Sybil Fix, from The Post and Courier (Charleston, South Carolina), June 7, 1997

American operatic baritones
1941 births
Living people
Contemporary classical music performers
Place of birth missing (living people)
Santa Clara University alumni
Music Academy of the West alumni
RogueArt artists